The fifth election to Pembrokeshire County Council was held on 3 May 2012.  It was preceded by the 2008 election and followed by the 2017 election. On the same day there were elections to 20 of the other 21 local authorities in Wales (all except Anglesey), community council elections in Wales and other elections elsewhere in the United Kingdom

All 60 council seats were up for election. The previous council was controlled by Independents as had been the case since the authority was formed in 1995. The Independents retained control in 2012.

Councillors elected in this election are to serve an extended five-year term, after the Welsh Government announced the next elections would be moved from 2016 to 2017 to avoid clashing with the next Welsh Assembly election in 2016 (which in turn had been delayed a year to avoid clashing with the next general election).

Although Independent councillors won a majority, there were divisions amongst them and an Independent Plus group has emerged with a small majority. The majority became precarious following the resignation of former Plaid Cymru councillor Stephen Joseph from the group in August 2014.

Overview

|}

Results

Amroth
Tony Brinsden had been elected as a Liberal Democrat in 2004 and 2008 but subsequently joined the Independents.

Burton

Camrose

Carew

Cilgerran

Clydau

-->

Crymych

Dinas Cross

East Williamston

Fishguard North East

Fishguard North West

-->

Goodwick

Haverfordwest Castle

Haverfordwest Garth

Haverfordwest Portfield

Haverfordwest Prendergast

Haverfordwest Priory

Hundleton

Johnston

Kilgetty / Begelly

Lampeter Velfrey

Lamphey

Letterston

Llangwm

Llanrhian

Maenclochog

Manorbier

Martletwy

Merlin’s Bridge
The winning candidate had stood for Labour in 2004 but as an Independent in 2008.

Milford Central
Stephen Joseph defeated long-serving Independent, Anne Hughes, a member since 1999. However he later left for the Independent Plus group, and left that group in August 2014.

Milford East

-->

Milford Hakin

Milford Hubberston

Milford North

Milford West

Narberth

Narberth Rural

Newport

Neyland East
Having been a Labour councillor since 1995, Simon Hancock did not explicitly stand as a Labour candidate and immediately after the election joined the Independent group.

Neyland West

Pembroke Monkton
Peral Llewellyn had originally been elected as a Labour candidate in 2004.

Pembroke St Mary North

Pembroke St Mary South

Pembroke St Michael

Pembroke Dock Central

Pembroke Dock Llanion

Pembroke Dock Market

Pembroke Dock Pennar

Penally

Rudbaxton

St David's

St Dogmaels

St Ishmael's

Saundersfoot

Scleddau

Solva

Tenby North

Tenby South

The Havens

Wiston

By-Elections 2012-2017

Burton by-election 2013
A by-election was held in the Burton Ward on 11 April 2013 following the retirement of David Wildman. The successful candidate stood as an 'Independent Plus' candidate, supporting the ruling group on the authority.

-->

References

2012
Pembrokeshire
21st century in Pembrokeshire